Beondegi, literally "pupa", is a Korean insect-based street food made with silkworm pupae. 

The boiled or steamed snack food is served in paper cups with toothpick skewers. Its aroma has been described as "nutty, shrimp-like, and a bit like canned corn" and the canned type smells very much "like tire rubber", while the texture is firm and chewy.

Beondegi is also served in soup form as beondegi-tang. This soup is flavoured with soy sauce, chili, garlic, green onions and red pepper powder. It is typically served as an anju (food consumed with alcohol) at pubs.

Canned beondegi and beondegi-tang can also be found in supermarkets and convenience stores.

History 
Although sericulture in Korea dates back 4,000 years, consumption of silkworm pupae (a byproduct of this industry) is relatively recent. Beondegi has been eaten in silk farming villages since at least the 1920s. Widespread consumption began after the Korean War, when the government heavily promoted the silk industry. Silkworm pupae were a protein source during the poverty of the time.

Gallery

References 

Insects as food
Street food in South Korea